The Blue Line is a light rail line in Santa Clara County, California, and part of the Santa Clara Valley Transportation Authority (VTA) light rail system. It serves 26 stations entirely in San Jose proper, traveling between Baypointe and Santa Teresa stations, stopping at San Jose International Airport (via a bus connection), Downtown San Jose, San Jose State University, and the Children's Discovery Museum of San Jose along the way. The line connects to Caltrain at Tamien. The Blue Line is one of three lines in the VTA Light Rail system; the other two being the Green Line and the Orange Line.

Route description
From north to south, the Blue Line starts at Baypointe station in North San Jose, travels south on First Street, through downtown San Jose, until reaching the San Jose Convention Center where the line enters the median of State Route 87 (the Guadalupe Freeway), until it approaches the interchange with State Route 85, where it briefly exits the median to serve Ohlone/Chynoweth station and enters the median of State Route 85 to its terminus at the Santa Teresa station in South San Jose.

The line formerly ran past Baypointe station serving stops all the way to Alum Rock. However, after the 2019 New Transit service plan, the line was cut back and service east of Baypointe is now served by the Orange Line.

Construction history

The Blue Line largely follows the path of VTA's original Guadalupe line that opened in phases between December 11, 1987 and April 25, 1991.

The section of track between Old Ironsides station and Tasman station is no longer served by Blue Line trains, but is still used by the Green Line.

This section also included a transit mall in downtown San Jose, where train tracks were laid into wide sidewalks, with nearby 1st Street (northbound) and 2nd Street (southbound) being narrowed down and having one lane dedicated to buses. The design allowed easy transfers between trains and buses, but because there is no clear delineation between the sidewalk and the track, pedestrians often unintentionally walk in front of trains, forcing VTA to slow trains to an average speed of just .

The freeway was built in the 1980s to accommodate the rail line with a large center median and provisions for stations.

After stopping at Ohlone/Chynoweth station, Blue Line trains enter the median of State Route 85 to continue on to Santa Teresa station in South San Jose. The line was constructed at the same time as State Route 85, which was also built to accommodate the light rail line in its median, and had not yet opened to vehicle traffic when trains started running.

The fourth and final section of the Guadalupe line also included a  spur track to the Almaden Valley, that was served by the Ohlone/Chynoweth–Almaden line until December 2019, when it was eliminated due to low ridership.

Commuter Express light rail
On October 4, 2010, the VTA introduced a Commuter Express light rail service on this line, which operated between Baypointe and Santa Teresa stations. The service operated three trips in the morning (northbound to Baypointe) and three trips in the afternoon (southbound to Santa Teresa) that called at all stops, except for nonstop operation between the Convention Center and Ohlone/Chynoweth stations. It offered free WiFi access on all trains on this service, and promised time savings of six to eight minutes. Ridership was low, with Commuter Express trains serving 530 of the more than 20,000 daily riders on the line. The Board of Directors voted to discontinue the Commuter Express effective October 2018.

Station stops

References

External links

 VTA Route Information

Santa Clara Valley Transportation Authority light rail lines
Railway lines in highway medians
Railway lines opened in 1991